Edward Wormald (4 December 1848 – 16 October 1928) was an English cricketer. Born at Islington, Middlesex, Wormald was a right-handed batsman who bowled right-arm fast.

Wormald was educated at Eton College where he played for the college cricket team in 1866 and 1867. He later made a single appearance in first-class cricket for Kent against the Gentlemen of Marylebone Cricket Club in 1870 at the St Lawrence Ground, scoring a total of 16 runs in what was a defeat for Kent. This was his only appearance in important matches.

He died at Brighton, Sussex on 16 October 1928.

References

External links

1848 births
1928 deaths
People from Islington (district)
People educated at Eton College
English cricketers
Kent cricketers